is a city located in Hyōgo Prefecture, Japan. , the city had an estimated population of 224,054 in 96463 households and a population density of 2200 persons per km². Known as the "inner parlor" of Kansai, Takarazuka is famous for the Takarazuka Revue, hot springs, and the Takarazuka Tourism Fireworks Display held since 1913. It is also famous as a choice residential area along with Ashiya and Nishinomiya.

Geography 
Takarazuka  is located in the northern part of the Hanshin area, surrounded by the Rokko Range to the west and the Nagao mountain range to the north, with the Muko River flowing through the center.

Neighboring municipalities
Hyōgo Prefecture
Kita-ku, Kobe
Inagawa
Kawanishi
Itami
Nishinomiya
Sanda

Climate
Takarazuka has a Humid subtropical climate (Köppen Cfa) characterized by warm summers and cool winters with light snowfall.  The average annual temperature in Takarazuka is 14.0 °C. The average annual rainfall is 1578 mm with September as the wettest month. The temperatures are highest on average in January, at around 25.7 °C, and lowest in January, at around 2.6 °C.

Demographics
Per Japanese census data, the population of Takarazuka has been increasing steadily since the 1950s.

History 
The area of Takarazuka was part of ancient Settsu Province and has been inhabited since ancient times, with many kofun burial mounds found within the city limits. The Mefu Jinja dates from the Nara period. From the Heian period, numerous landed estates shōen controlled by the Fujiwara family were developed in the area. Takarazuka onsen is mentioned in Kamakura period records. In the Muromachi period, Kohama town developed as a temple town for Kōshō-ji, and subsequently  Kohama Inn was established as a post station on Arima Road. The area was mostly  tenryō territory under direct control of the Tokugawa shogunate in the Edo Period. 

The village of Kohama (小浜村) was established on April 1, 1889 within Kawabe District, Hyōgo, with the creation of the modern municipalities system. In 1897, Hankaku Railroad (current Fukuchiyama Line) completed. In 1910, the Minoh Arima Electric Railway (current Hankyu Takarazuka Main Line completed). Takarazuka was a center of the culture from the 1910s to 1940s in what has been dubbed the age of Hanshinkan Modernism. This included the opening of the Takarazuka Girls' Opera (current Takarazuka Revue) on April 1, 1914.

Kohama was elevated to town status on March 15, 1951, changing its name to Takarazuka. On April 1 1954 it merged with the village of Yoshimoto (吉本村) in Muko District  to become the city of Takarazuka. The city continued to expand by annexing Nagao Village on March 10, 1955, and Nishitani Village on March 14, 1955, but losing some areas in a border adjustment with the city of Itami on April 1, 1955. On January 17, 1995 the Great Hanshin earthquake caused more than 100 casualties. Takarazuka was designated as a Special City on April 1, 2003 with increased autonomy.

At one time, the idea was raised of merging Takarazuka with Itami, Kawanishi, and Inagawa, but it is currently on hold.

Government
Takarazuka has a mayor-council form of government with a directly elected mayor and a unicameral city council of 26 members. Takarazuka contributes three members to the Hyōgo Prefectural Assembly. In terms of national politics, the city is divided between the Hyōgo 6th districts of the lower house of the Diet of Japan.

Economy
Takarazuka has a mixed economy of commerce, manufacturing and market gardening. It is increasing a bedroom community for Osaka and Kobe, with quiet, upscale residential neighborhoods like Nigawa, Obayashi, Sakasegawa, and Hibarigaoka.

Companied headquartered in Takarazuka
 HI-LEX Corporation, a manufacturer of remote-controlling cables and accessories for multiple applications is headquartered in the city.
 ShinMaywa Industries, a manufacturer of military aircraft (especially seaplanes) and heavy duty trucks is headquartered in the city.

Education
Universities and colleges
Koshien University 
Takarazuka University
Takarazuka Music School

Primary and secondary schools
Takazuka has 23 public elementary schools and 12 public middle schools operated by the city government, and five public high schools operated by the Hyōgo Prefectural Board of Education. There are three private elementary schools, two private middle schools and two private high schools. In addition, the prefecture also operates one special education school for the handicapped.

Transportation

Railways 
Kawanishi is serviced by the JR Takarazuka Line and the Hankyu Takarazuka Line. Hankyu's Kawanishi-Noseguchi Station is a transfer station to the Nose Railway, which runs primarily within Kawanishi.

 JR West - Fukuchiyama Line
  -   -  
 Hankyu - Takarazuka Main Line
  -  -  -  -  
 Hankyu - Imazu Line
  -  -  -  -

Highways 
   Chūgoku Expressway
  Shin-Meishin Expressway

Buses
Hankyu Bus
Hanshin Dentetsu Bus
Hankyu Country Bus
Shinki Bus

Twin towns – sister cities

Takarazuka is twinned with:
 Alsergrund (Vienna), Austria
 Augusta, United States

Local attractions

Specialty products
Ornamental trees and flowers (dahlias, irises, etc.)
 Tansan senbei

Places

Takarazuka Bow Hall

Takarazuka Hotel

: Mixed Western- and Japanese-style mansion built in 1918–1919. (Designed by Masaharu Furuzuka. National Registry of Tangible Cultural Properties. Filming location for NHK drama .)
Takarazuka City Historical Archives (former Matsumoto Residence): Western-style mansion built in 1937. (National Registry of Tangible Cultural Properties)

Nomura Koumuten House (Designed by Antonino Cardillo in 2009)

Religious institutions
Temples
Nakayamadera
Kiyoshikoujin Seichou-ji
Heirin-ji
Gosho-ji
Shrines
Mefu Jinja

Sightseeing and festivals

Takarazuka Revue
Flower Road
Takarazuka Tourism Fireworks Display
Takarazuka Memorial (horse race)

Notable people from Takarazuka
Saki Aibu, actress and celebrity
Kyoko Hikami, voice actress
Makoto Imaoka, professional baseball player
Minami Itahashi, Olympic diver
Shinji Okazaki, footballer
Akira Raijin, professional wrestler
Kosaku Shimada, professional golfer
Osamu Tezuka, cartoonist
Tarō Yamamoto, actor and politician

References

External links

 
 
Takarazuka Revue 
Osamu Tezuka Manga Museum 

 
Cities in Hyōgo Prefecture